The Chinese Development Assistance Council (CDAC) is a joint development between the Singapore Chinese Chamber of Commerce and Industry (SCCCI) and the Singapore Federation of Chinese Clan Associations (SFCCA). The council was established in 1992, with mission of "to nurture and develop the potential of the Chinese community in contributing to the success of a multiracial Singapore".

External links
 Singapedia
 Home Page

Organizations established in 1992